Gardenia candida is a species of asterid flowering plant in the family Rubiaceae. This species is endemic to Fiji with populations known from dry tropical forest thickets on the Island of Vanua Levu, and from tropical forests of Viti Levu Island.  Native gardenias of the Fiji Islands and elsewhere in the paleotropics possess a diverse array of natural products.  Methoxylated and oxygenated flavonols and triterpenes accumulate on the vegetative- and floral-buds as yellow to brown droplets of secreted resin.  Focused phytochemical studies of these bud exudates have been published, including a population-level study of another rare, sympatric species, G. grievei.

References

Endemic flora of Fiji
candida
Critically endangered plants
Taxonomy articles created by Polbot